The 1972 Swedish Pro Tennis Championships – Singles was an event of the 1972 Swedish Pro Tennis Championships men's tennis tournament played at the Scandinavium in Gothenburg, Sweden from 30 October until 5 November 1972. The draw consisted of 32 players. John Newcombe was the defending singles champion. He retained the singles title, defeating Roy Emerson in the final, 6–0, 6–3, 6–1.

Seeds
Seeds unavailable.

Draw

Finals

Top half

Bottom half

References

Singles